Hayanari Shimoda (下田隼成; Shimoda Hayanari) (born July 16, 1984) is a Japanese race car driver, born in Tokyo.

His career started in 1997 in karting, Shimoda moving up to Italian Formula Renault in 2001. Happy to travel the world to further his career, he raced part of the 2002 Japanese GT Series and fill-in races in both Formula Renault 2000 Eurocup and British Formula Renault.

A full season in Formula Renault V6 Eurocup followed in 2003, as well as a part season in the World Sportscar Championship and one race in the American Le Mans Series. He stayed in the V6 Eurocup in 2004, and was also set to drive in the Le Mans Endurance Series before complications prevented him from doing so.

Shimoda was set to be the second driver for the SuperNova team in GP2 Series during 2005. However, at the last minute, he was replaced by Adam Carroll who will now partner ex-Jordan Grand Prix driver Giorgio Pantano.

He finished third in the Le Mans Endurance Series LMP1 championship for Zytek, winning the 1000 km Nürburgring.

In 2005 he won the Monterey Sports Car Championships, the final race of the season in the ALMS. He was partnered by Tom Chilton in a Zytek 04S LMP1 sports prototype.

He also represented Japan in the A1 Grand Prix series for the first time at Eastern Creek in November 2005, and was lucky to escape with only a concussion after a spectacular crash in which the engine separated from the chassis. He also occurred in another spectacular crash at the A1 Grand Prix round in Mexico. The cars were under a yellow flag when as they were coming onto the pit straight Shimoda's car was launched airborne after hitting the back of A1 Team New Zealand's car. Shimoda escaped unhurt.

He is currently racing in the World Series by Renault championship for the Victory Engineering team.

Racing record

Complete 24 Hours of Le Mans results

Complete Formula Renault 3.5 Series results
(key) (Races in bold indicate pole position) (Races in italics indicate fastest lap)

† Driver did not finish the race, but was classified as he completed more than 90% of the race distance.

References

1984 births
Living people
Japanese racing drivers
Italian Formula Renault 2.0 drivers
Formula Renault V6 Eurocup drivers
British Formula Renault 2.0 drivers
Formula Renault Eurocup drivers
A1 Team Japan drivers
24 Hours of Le Mans drivers
American Le Mans Series drivers
European Le Mans Series drivers
World Series Formula V8 3.5 drivers

Victory Engineering drivers
Arena Motorsport drivers
David Price Racing drivers
Jota Sport drivers
A1 Grand Prix drivers
Carlin racing drivers